Therese Donovan is an Australian Paralympic swimmer with a vision impairment. At the 1984 New York/Stoke Mandeville Games, she won three silver medals in the Women's 100 m Breaststroke B2, Women's 100 m Freestyle B2 and Women's 400 m Freestyle B2 events, and two bronze medals in the Women's 100 m Backstroke B2 and Women's 200 m Individual Medley B2 events.

References

Female Paralympic swimmers of Australia
Swimmers at the 1984 Summer Paralympics
Medalists at the 1984 Summer Paralympics
Paralympic silver medalists for Australia
Paralympic bronze medalists for Australia
Paralympic medalists in swimming
Australian female breaststroke swimmers
Australian female freestyle swimmers
Paralympic swimmers with a vision impairment
Australian blind people
20th-century Australian women
Year of birth missing (living people)
Living people